Poly1305 is a universal hash family designed by Daniel J. Bernstein for use in cryptography.

As with any universal hash family, Poly1305 can be used as a one-time message authentication code to authenticate a single message using a key shared between sender and recipient,
like a one-time pad can be used to conceal the content of a single message using a key shared between sender and recipient.

Originally Poly1305 was proposed as part of Poly1305-AES,
a Carter–Wegman authenticator
that combines the Poly1305 hash with AES-128 to authenticate many messages using a single short key and distinct message numbers.
Poly1305 was later applied with a single-use key generated for each message using XSalsa20 in the NaCl crypto_secretbox_xsalsa20poly1305 authenticated cipher,
and then using ChaCha in the ChaCha20-Poly1305 authenticated cipher
deployed in TLS on the internet.

Description

Definition of Poly1305
Poly1305 takes a 16-byte secret key  and an -byte message  and returns a 16-byte hash .
To do this, Poly1305:

 Interprets  as a little-endian 16-byte integer.
 Breaks the message  into consecutive 16-byte chunks.
 Interprets the 16-byte chunks as 17-byte little-endian integers by appending a 1 byte to every 16-byte chunk, to be used as coefficients of a polynomial.
 Evaluates the polynomial at the point  modulo the prime .
 Reduces the result modulo  encoded in little-endian return a 16-byte hash.

The coefficients  of the polynomial , where , are:

with the exception that, if , then:

The secret key  is restricted to have the bytes , i.e., to have their top four bits clear; and to have the bytes , i.e., to have their bottom two bits clear.

Use as a one-time authenticator

If  is a secret 16-byte string interpreted as a little-endian integer, then

is called the authenticator for the message .
If a sender and recipient share the 32-byte secret key  in advance, chosen uniformly at random, then the sender can transmit an authenticated message .
When the recipient receives an alleged authenticated message  (which may have been modified in transmit by an adversary), they can verify its authenticity by testing whether

However, the same key  must not be reused for two messages.
If the adversary learns

and find a root of the resulting polynomial to recover a small list of candidates for the secret evaluation point , and from that the secret pad .
The adversary can then use this to forge additional messages with high probability.

Use in Poly1305-AES as a Carter–Wegman authenticator

Poly1305-AES uses AES-128 to generate , where  is encoded as a 16-byte little-endian integer.

Specifically, a Poly1305-AES key is a 32-byte pair  of a 16-byte evaluation point , as above, and a 16-byte AES key .
The Poly1305-AES authenticator on a message  is

where 16-byte strings and integers are identified by little-endian encoding.
Note that  is reused between messages.

Suppose the adversary sees  authenticated messages and attempts  forgeries, and can distinguish  from a uniform random permutation with advantage at most .
(Unless AES is broken,  is very small.)
The adversary's chance of success at a single forgery is at most:

The message number  must never be repeated with the same key .

Use in NaCl and ChaCha20-Poly1305

The NaCl crypto_secretbox_xsalsa20poly1305 authenticated cipher uses a message number  with the XSalsa20 stream cipher to generate a per-message key stream, the first 32 bytes of which are taken as a one-time Poly1305 key  and the rest of which is used for encrypting the message.
It then uses Poly1305 as a one-time authenticator for the ciphertext of the message.
ChaCha20-Poly1305 does the same but with ChaCha instead of XSalsa20.

Security
The security of Poly1305 and its derivatives against forgery follows from its bounded difference probability as a universal hash family:

where  is a uniform random Poly1305 key.

where  in this case.

Of one-time authenticator

With a one-time authenticator , the adversary's success probability for any forgery attempt  on a message  of up to  bytes is:

Of NaCl and ChaCha20-Poly1305

For NaCl crypto_secretbox_xsalsa20poly1305 and ChaCha20-Poly1305, the adversary's success probability at forgery is the same for each message independently as for a one-time authenticator, plus the adversary's distinguishing advantage  against XSalsa20 or ChaCha as pseudorandom functions used to generate the per-message key.
In other words, the probability that the adversary succeeds at a single forgery after  attempts of messages up to  bytes is at most:

Of Poly1305-AES

The security of Poly1305-AES against forgery follows from the Carter–Wegman–Shoup structure, which instantiates a Carter–Wegman authenticator with a permutation to generate the per-message pad.
If an adversary sees  authenticated messages and attempts  forgeries of messages of up to  bytes, and if the adversary has distinguishing advantage at most  against AES-128 as a pseudorandom permutation, then the probability the adversary succeeds at any one of the  forgeries is at most:

Speed
Poly1305-AES can be computed at high speed in various CPUs: for an n-byte message, no more than 3.1n + 780 Athlon cycles are needed, for example.
The author has released optimized source code for Athlon, Pentium Pro/II/III/M, PowerPC, and UltraSPARC, in addition to non-optimized reference implementations in C and C++ as public domain software.

Implementations 
Below is a list of cryptography libraries that support Poly1305:

 Botan
 Bouncy Castle
 Crypto++
 Libgcrypt
 libsodium
 Nettle
 OpenSSL
 LibreSSL
 wolfCrypt
 GnuTLS
 mbed TLS
 MatrixSSL

See also 
 ChaCha20-Poly1305 – an AEAD scheme combining the stream cipher ChaCha20 with a variant of Poly1305

References

External links
 Poly1305-AES reference and optimized implementation by author D. J. Bernstein
 Fast Poly1305 implementation in C on github.com
 NaCl one-time authenticator and authenticated cipher using Poly1305

Advanced Encryption Standard
Internet Standards
Message authentication codes
Public-domain software with source code